The Complete Live in Japan is a live album by the Art Ensemble of Chicago recorded in Tokyo, Japan in 1984 and released in 1988 on the Japanese DIW label. The original (much shorter) single LP titled Live in Japan was originally issued in 1985.

Track listing 
 "Spanish Song" (Roscoe Mitchell) - 25:05
 "Ancestral Voices/Old" (Joseph Jarman/Mitchell) - 11:14
 "Ornedaruth" (Jarman) - 22:43
 "The Beginning" (Lester Bowie) - 3:27
 "Waltz" (Mitchell) - 2:39
 "Building the Mid" (Don Moye) - 6:09
 "Old Time Southside Street Dance" (Jarman) - 10:02
 "Zero" (Bowie) - 6:45
 "Funky Aeco" (Art Ensemble of Chicago) - 5:18
 "Odwalla/Theme" (Mitchell) - 3:29

Personnel 
 Lester Bowie: trumpet, bass drum
 Malachi Favors Maghostut: bass, percussion instruments
 Joseph Jarman: saxophones, clarinets, percussion instruments
 Roscoe Mitchell: saxophones, clarinets, flute, percussion instruments
 Don Moye: drums, percussion

References 

Art Ensemble of Chicago live albums
1988 live albums
DIW Records live albums